Dinesh Manocha is an Indian-American computer scientist and the Paul Chrisman Iribe Professor of Computer Science at University of Maryland College Park, formerly at University of North Carolina at Chapel Hill. His research interests are in scientific computation, robotics, self-driving cars, affective computing, virtual and augmented reality and 3D computer graphics.

Biography 
Dinesh Manocha is currently a Paul Chrisman Iribe Professor Professor of computer science at the University of Maryland, College Park. He received his B.Tech. degree in computer science and engineering from the Indian Institute of Technology, Delhi in 1987; M.S. and Ph.D. in computer science at the University of California at  Berkeley in 1990 and 1992, respectively.

Manocha has supervised more than 45 MS and Ph.D. students. He is married to his frequent collaborator and UMD faculty colleague, Ming C. Lin.

Research 
Manocha's research interests include  geometric computing, interactive computer graphics, physics-based simulation and robotics. He has published more than 280 papers in these areas.

Awards and honors 
Manocha has received  more than 11 best paper and panel awards  at the ACM SuperComputing, ACM Multimedia, ACM Solid Modeling, Pacific Graphics, IEEE VR, IEEE Visualization, ACM SIGMOD, ACM VRST, CAD, I/ITSEC and Eurographics Conferences. He was selected as an ACM Fellow in 2009 "for contributions to geometric computing and applications to computer graphics, robotics and GPU computing", and is also an AAAS Fellow.

References

External links 
 Dinesh Manocha home page at the Department of Computer Science, University of Maryland
 

Computer graphics researchers
Fellows of the Association for Computing Machinery
Indian computer scientists
IIT Delhi alumni
Living people
Researchers in geometric algorithms
University of California, Berkeley alumni
University of North Carolina at Chapel Hill faculty
Year of birth missing (living people)